The 1901–02 Haverford Fords men's soccer team represented Haverford College during the 1901–02 college soccer season. It was the Fords first season of existence. The Fords competed in ACCL and were deemed national co-champions by the American Soccer History Archives and the Intercollegiate Football Research Association. The Fords garnered a record of four wins, a loss and no draws.

Schedule 

|-
!colspan=6 style="background:#c91631; color:#FFFFFF; border:2px solid #000000;"| Regular season
|-

|-
|}

References 

Haverford
1902
1901 in sports in Pennsylvania
1902 in sports in Pennsylvania
College soccer national championship-winning seasons (1866–1904)